Out of the Woods is a studio album by the American jazz group Oregon released in April 1978. The album peaked at number 17 on the Billboard Jazz Albums chart the same year.

Track listing

 "Yellow Bell" (Ralph Towner) – 7:02
 "Fall 77" (Glen Moore) – 4:26 
 "Reprise" (Ralph Towner) – 1:02 
 "Cane Fields" (Paul McCandless) – 4:35 
 "Dance to the Morning Star" (Collin Walcott) – 5:36
 "Vision of a Dancer" (Ralph Towner) – 4:03
 "Story Telling" (Collin Walcott) – 1:03
 "Waterwheel" (Ralph Towner) – 6:26
 "Witchi-Tai-To" (Jim Pepper) – 8:24

Personnel
 Musicians
 Paul McCandless – bass clarinet, English horn, oboe
 Glen Moore – bass, guitar
 Ralph Towner – flugelhorn, guitar, 12 String guitar, classical guitar, percussion, piano
 Collin Walcott – guitar, percussion, sitar, tabla

 Other credits
 Hayward Connor – liner notes
 Ron Coro – design
 Joe Gastwirt – mastering
 David Greene – engineer
 Jesse Henderson – associate engineer
 Johnny Lee – design
 Matt Murray – associate engineer
 Boe Overlock – photography
 David Wilcox – illustrations

Charts

References

Oregon (band) albums
1978 albums